Port del Comte (massif), massif located in the pre-Pyrenees, in Catalonia
 Port del Comte (mountain range), mountain range located north of the Port del Comte massif 
 Port del Comte (ski resort), ski resort located at the Port del Comte mountain range